Blessuan Austin (born July 19, 1996) is an American football cornerback who is a free agent. He played college football at Rutgers.

Professional career

New York Jets
Austin was drafted by the New York Jets in the sixth round, 196th overall, of the 2019 NFL Draft. He was placed on the reserve/non-football injury list on August 31, 2019. He was activated off the NFI on November 7. He was placed on injured reserve on November 21, 2020. He was activated on December 12, 2020.

On September 1, 2021, Austin was waived by the Jets.

Seattle Seahawks
On September 7, 2021, Austin was signed by the Seattle Seahawks.

Denver Broncos
On April 27, 2022, Austin was signed by the Denver Broncos. He was waived on August 29, 2022.

References

External links
Rutgers Scarlet Knights bio

1996 births
Living people
Sportspeople from Queens, New York
Players of American football from New York City
American football cornerbacks
Denver Broncos players
Rutgers Scarlet Knights football players
New York Jets players
Seattle Seahawks players